Hofburg is a Thoroughbred racehorse foaled in 2015.  He finished second in the 2018 Florida Derby, third in the 2018 Belmont Stakes, and seventh in the 2018 Kentucky Derby.

References

2015 racehorse births
Racehorses bred in Kentucky
Racehorses trained in the United States
Thoroughbred family 2-d